La Chapelle-sur-Oudon (La Chapelle on Oudon) is a former commune in the Maine-et-Loire department of western France. On 15 December 2016, it was merged into the new commune Segré-en-Anjou Bleu.

Geography
The river Oudon forms all of the commune's northern border.

See also
Communes of the Maine-et-Loire department

References

Chapellesuroudon